Richard D. Clarke Jr. (born July 23, 1962) is a United States Army four-star general who last served as the 12th commander of United States Special Operations Command from March 29, 2019 to August 30, 2022. Prior to assuming command of USSOCOM, General Clarke served as Director for Strategic Plans and Policy (J5), Joint Staff, the Pentagon, Arlington, Virginia.

Military career

Clarke was born in West Germany and raised in an Army family. He is a graduate of the United States Military Academy at West Point, New York, and commissioned into the Infantry Branch in 1984. He holds a Bachelor of Science degree from West Point and a Master of Business Administration from Benedictine College. He is a distinguished graduate of the National War College and earned a master's degree in Security and Strategic Studies.

Clarke has led soldiers at all levels in Airborne, Ranger, Mechanized and Light Infantry units in five different divisions, the 173rd Airborne Brigade, and the 75th Ranger Regiment in the United States, Europe, Iraq and Afghanistan. Clarke spent eight years in the 75th Ranger Regiment as a company commander from 1994 to 1996, then as a battalion commander from 2004 to 2006 and regimental commander from 2007 to 2009. He also served as battalion commander of 3rd Battalion, 504th Parachute Infantry Regiment, 82nd Airborne Division from 2002 to 2004. His most recent assignments include serving as the Director for Strategic Plans and Policy (J5), Joint Staff, the Pentagon, Arlington, Virginia. from 2017 to 2019. General Clarke's other assignments as a general officer include: Deputy Commanding General for Operations, 10th Mountain Division from 2011 to 2013; the 74th Commandant of Cadets, United States Military Academy at West Point from 2013 to 2014; and the Commander of the 82nd Airborne Division from 2014 to 2016.

Clarke's deployments while serving in the aforementioned positions include Operations Desert Shield and Desert Storm, Operation Joint Guardian in Macedonia, three deployments in support of Operation Enduring Freedom, four deployments in support of Operation Iraqi Freedom, and one deployment as the commander of the Combined Joint Forces Land Component Command – Operation Inherent Resolve.

Clarke was appointed the 12th Commander of United States Special Operations Command (USSOCOM) on March 29, 2019.

Awards and decorations

References

United States Army personnel of the Iraq War
United States Army personnel of the War in Afghanistan (2001–2021)
Living people
Recipients of the Defense Distinguished Service Medal
Recipients of the Distinguished Service Medal (US Army)
Recipients of the Defense Superior Service Medal
Recipients of the Legion of Merit
United States Army generals
Place of birth missing (living people)
1962 births